The Taita thrush (Turdus helleri), also known as the Taita olive thrush or Heller's ground thrush, is an endangered bird from the family of thrushes (Turdidae), endemic to the Taita Hills in Kenya.

Description
The Taita thrush was previously classified as subspecies of the olive thrush (Turdus olivaceus), but it is regarded as distinct species since 1985. It reaches a length between 20 and 22 centimetres. Head, breast and upperparts are coloured darkly. The underparts are white and the flanks have a rufous hue. The eyes and the bill exhibit a pale orange coloration. It was named after zoologist Edmund Heller (1875–1939) a workmate of the American ornithologist Edgar Alexander Mearns (1856–1916) who described this species scientifically in 1913.

Distribution
The Taita thrush is a forest-dependent endemic bird confined to four forests in the Taita Hills (in the south east of Kenya): Mbololo, Chawia, Yale and Ngangao. The forests cover a tiny 342 ha. Conservationists are using birds – with the thrush as the flagship species – to champion the conservation of the Taita Hills forests.

Ecology
It is restricted to montane moist forests. Despite its natural native habitat having been severely logged in the past, it has avoided forests with secondary growth, shrub vegetation, and cultivated areas. Extensive research has shown only very few migrations between the fragmented populations.

References

External links
Birdlife factsheet - Turdus helleri
Taita-Hills Biodiversity Project Report (pdf)
Taita thrush illustrated on a stamp

Taita thrush
Endemic birds of Kenya
Critically endangered fauna of Africa
Taita thrush
Taxa named by Edgar Alexander Mearns